Horstman is a surname of Dutch origin, or of German origin as a variant of Horstmann. Notable people with the surname include:

Ed Horstman, American naval architect and multihull sailboat designer
Katie Horstman (born 1935), American baseball player

References

Surnames of Dutch origin
Surnames of German origin